The Eurovision Song Contest 1984, the 29th edition of the annual Eurovision Song Contest. Organised by the European Broadcasting Union (EBU) and host broadcaster RTL Télévision (RTL), the contest was held at the Théâtre Municipal on 5 May 1984 and was hosted by Luxembourgish multimedia personality Désirée Nosbusch, who was only 19 years at the date, making her the youngest presenter in adult Eurovision history.

Nineteen countries took part in the contest.  did not enter due to it conflicting with the country's Yom HaZikaron holiday again.  was also absent. On the other hand, who had not participated the previous year, returned this year.

Richard and Louis Herrey became the first teenage males to win Eurovision and  remain the youngest ever adult Eurovision male winners, being 19 years and 260 days and 18 years and 184 days of age respectively.

Location 

Luxembourg City is a commune with city status, and the capital of the Grand Duchy of Luxembourg. It is located at the confluence of the Alzette and Pétrusse Rivers in southern Luxembourg. The city contains the historic Luxembourg Castle, established by the Franks in the Early Middle Ages, around which a settlement developed.

The Grand Théâtre de Luxembourg, inaugurated in 1964 as the Théâtre Municipal de la Ville de Luxembourg, became the venue for the 1984 contest. It is the city's major venue for drama, opera and ballet. It also hosted the 1973 edition of the Eurovision Song Contest.

Format 
Unusually, the live orchestra was not seen on camera, being positioned slightly under the stage itself in a traditional orchestra pit, out of sight of the cameras.

Désirée Nosbusch, a Luxembourg native working and living in the USA at the time, was, at 19 years of age, the youngest ever host of the competition. She hosted the show in a lax manner, which was quite unusual for the show at the time. Her style was also unusual in that, rather than making announcements in multiple languages, she instead switched between English, French, German and Luxembourgish mid-sentences, not finishing any of her announcements in a single language.

The postcards in between each song were of a similar concept to those first devised for the  competition and featured mime artists virtually visiting each of the participant nations. The actors, known collectively as "The Tourists", were superimposed onto animated representations of the tourist attractions of each country, with the combined use of animated and real props, all created using the Chroma-Key process.

1984 is also notable for the audible booing that could be heard from the audience, particularly at the end of the UK's performance. It was said that the booing was due to English football hooligans having rioted in Luxembourg in November 1983 after failing to qualify for the 1984 UEFA European Football Championship.

Participating countries 
Nineteen participating countries competed this year.  did not enter due to it conflicting with the country's Yom HaZikaron holiday again.  was also absent. , who had not participated the previous year, returned this year.

Conductors 
Each performance had a conductor who directed the orchestra.

 Curt-Eric Holmquist
 Pascal Stivé
 François Rauber
 Eddy Guerin
 Sigurd Jansen
 John Coleman
 Pierre Cao
 
 Noel Kelehan
 
 Rogier van Otterloo
 
 Richard Oesterreicher
 Pierre Cao
 Selçuk Basar
 Ossi Runne
 Mario Robbiani
 Giusto Pio

Returning artists

Participants and results

Detailed voting results 

Each country had a jury that awarded one to eight, 10 and 12 points for their top ten songs.

At the close of the penultimate jury's votes, there was only a difference of six points between Sweden and Ireland, at 141 and 135 respectively. However, Yugoslavia was the only country who had not given any points to Ireland, and Portugal, the last jury, gave them only two points, crushing their chances. Portugal's voting also cost Denmark, who had been holding at a strong third position, even leading the scoreboard for a short time, a potential victory, when Portugal's 12 lifted Spain from 94 to 106 points. Portugal at the same time had only given Denmark one point making Denmark's total 101 points. Despite this, this was the latter country's best position in over 20 years.

12 points
Below is a summary of all 12 points in the final:

Spokespersons 

Each country announced their votes in the order of performance. The following is a list of spokespersons who announced the votes for their respective country.

 Agneta Bolme Börjefors
 Jacques Harvey
 Nicole André
 Matilde Jarrín
 Egil Teige
 Colin Berry
 Anna Partelidou
 Jacques Olivier
 John Skehan
 
 Flip van der Schalie
 Snežana Lipkovska-Hadžinaumova
 Tilia Herold
 Ruth Kappelsberger
 Başak Doğru
 Solveig Herlin
 Michel Stocker
 Mariolina Cannuli
 João Abel Fonseca

Broadcasts 

Each participating broadcaster was required to relay the contest via its networks. Non-participating EBU member broadcasters were also able to relay the contest as "passive participants". Broadcasters were able to send commentators to provide coverage of the contest in their own native language and to relay information about the artists and songs to their television viewers. Known details on the broadcasts in each country, including the specific broadcasting stations and commentators are shown in the tables below.

Notes

References

External links

 

 
1984
Music festivals in Luxembourg
1984 in music
Music in Luxembourg City
Events in Luxembourg City
1984 in Luxembourg
20th century in Luxembourg City
May 1984 events in Europe